Shi Pengqing (born 16 April 1999) is a Chinese footballer currently playing as a midfielder for Zhejiang Professional.

Career statistics

Club
.

References

1999 births
Living people
Chinese footballers
Association football midfielders
China League Two players
Zhejiang Professional F.C. players